Sagar Institute of Science & Technology (SISTec) is a NAAC Accredited college located in Bhopal, Madhya Pradesh, approved by All India Council for Technical Education (AICTE) and affiliated to Rajiv Gandhi Proudyogiki Vishwavidyalaya (RGPV) for engineering program and Barkatullah University (BU Bhopal) for MBA program.

History 

Sagar Group of Institutions is the educational wing of the Sagar Group that comprises three engineering colleges, a pharmacy college, a management college and five public schools in Bhopal. The Sagar Group came into existence in the year 2007 under the leadership of the Chairman Shri Sudhir Kumar Agrawal. It has now transformed into one of the largest corporate houses and business conglomerate in the Central India.

Sagar Group of Institutions 
Sagar Group of Institutions comprises ten institutions with around 10,000 students and more than 650 faculty members.
 
List of Institutes:

Sagar Institute of Science and Technology (SISTec)
Sagar Institute of Science, Technology & Engineering (SISTec-E)
Sagar Institute of Science, Technology & Research (SISTec-R)
Sagar Institute of Pharmacy & Technology (SIPTec)
Sagar Institute of Science & Technology - School of Management Studies (SISTec MBA)
Sagar Public School, Saket Nagar (SPS - SN)
Sagar Public School, Gandhi Nagar (SPS - GN)
Sagar Public School, Rohit Nagar (SPS - RN)
Sagar Public School, Ratibad (SPS - RB)
Sagar Public School, Katara Extension (SPS - KE)

Awards & Recognition

 Most Upcoming Engineering College in India - 2016 by ASSOCHAM
 Most Upcoming Engineering College in India - 2017 by ASSOCHAM
 Best Technical Institution Excellence Award - 2017 by IBC 24 News Channel
 Most Innovative College Award -2018 North Zone by AICTE
 Emerging Engineering Institute of the Year - Central India -2019 by ASSOCHAM
Excellence in Education Award - 2020 by ZEE MPCG News
Best Placement in Central India Award - 2020 by ZEE MPCG News
Icon for Excellence in MBA Education by 94.3 MY FM
ARIIA-2020 Ranking (Top 51-75 Private/Self-Financed College/Institutes in Bhopal Madhya Pradesh)
National Employability Award 2021
Excellence in Promoting Industry-Academic Interface Award - 2021 by ASSOCHAM
ARIIA-2021 Ranking [Performer Band under the category "Colleges/Institutes (Private/Self Financed) (Technical)”]

Campus Facilities

 40+ acre Campus
 250+ labs
 Digital Classrooms
 Open Amphitheater
 Learning Resource Center (Library) with 45000+ books and various other study-materials
 Hostel and Mess facility for 1000+ occupants (separate boys' and girls' areas)
 Six-lane Swimming Pool
 100+ buses spread across the city
 Gym
 ATM
 Canteen

Events and Activities

 Sagar Fiesta (Annual Techno-Cultural Fest)
 Sagar Manthan (Training & Placement Seminar and Workshop)
 Sagar Glory (Annual Celebration acknowledging the success of Placed Students)
 Sagar Samarthya (360 Degree Student Assessment Programme)
 NIRMAAN (Annual National Level Working Model Competition)
 Industrial Visits
 Expert Lectures and Tech Talks
 Celebrity Nights (Musical Performances)
 Semester Break Trainings (Industry Oriented Practical Learning Sessions)

Institute's USP 

 90% Result Across Subjects
 Industry Oriented Teaching Modules
 Meritorious Student Reward Program (Academic Scholarship)
 ERP Based Academic System
 Internships in Core Companies
 Entrepreneurship Development Cell (Dedicated team for Startups Initiative)

Training & Placement Highlights

 89% campus placements
 30 MoUs signed
 842+ job offers
 21 LPA highest package offered by BNY Mellon to 2020-21 Batch
 170+ core company visits for campus placements
 24 Campus Recruitment Training (CRT) Modules
 765 Internships for Pre-Final Year Students 
 90 Industrial Visits

References

External links

 

2007 establishments in Madhya Pradesh
Engineering colleges in Madhya Pradesh
Educational institutions established in 2007
Education in Bhopal
Universities and colleges in Madhya Pradesh